Fusarium acutatum is a fungus species of the genus Fusarium. Fusarium acutatum can cause gangrenous necrosis on the feet from diabetic patients. Fusarium acutatum produces fumonisin B1, fumonisin B2, fumonisin B3 and 8-O-Methyl-fusarubin.

References

Further reading
 
 

acaciae-mearnsii
Fungi described in 1998